Jammal-ud-Din Affendi (born 23 June 1908, date of death unknown) was an Afghan field hockey player, who competed at the 1936 Summer Olympic Games and played in both of his team's games.

References

`

External links
 

Afghan male field hockey players
Olympic field hockey players of Afghanistan
Field hockey players at the 1936 Summer Olympics
Year of death missing
1908 births